Abbadia Lariana is a comune (municipality) in the Province of Lecco in the Italian region of Lombardy, located about  northeast of Milan and about  northwest of Lecco. The village has about 3,280 inhabitants and its name comes from an abbey (abbazia in Italian) founded in the 9th century and later destroyed.

History 
Archaeological excavations dated the first settlement to Roman period. The benedictine abbey was founded in 770 - 775 by the Lombardic King Desiderius and gave the name to the city. During the 17th to 19th centuries, the silk industry developed here, from 1817 led by the family of Pietro Monti, later by Cima.

Historical and cultural monuments 
 San Lorenzo Church, famous picture Madonna della cintura con santi Agostino, Monica e Domenico
 Waterfall Cenghen
 Civico Museo Setificio Monti − city silk museum in a former silk factory of the family Monti

References

External links
 Official website